Raddi is a surname. Notable people with the surname include:

 Giuseppe Raddi (1770–1829), Italian botanist and curator
 Al-Saddiq Al-Raddi (born 1969), Sudanese writer and poet